Yuzo Tateishi is a Japanese mixed martial artist.

Mixed martial arts record

|-
| Loss
| align=center| 1-4
| Caol Uno
| Submission (rear naked choke)
| Shooto: Gig
| 
| align=center| 1
| align=center| 2:14
| Tokyo, Japan
| 
|-
| Loss
| align=center| 1-3
| Hiroyuki Kojima
| Submission (kimura)
| Shooto: Let's Get Lost
| 
| align=center| 1
| align=center| 3:00
| Tokyo, Japan
| 
|-
| Loss
| align=center| 1-2
| Yuji Fujita
| Decision (unanimous)
| Shooto: Free Fight Kawasaki
| 
| align=center| 3
| align=center| 3:00
| Kawasaki, Kanagawa, Japan
| 
|-
| Loss
| align=center| 1-1
| Masanori Suda
| Submission (armbar)
| Lumax Cup: Tournament of J '96
| 
| align=center| 1
| align=center| 1:51
| Japan
| 
|-
| Win
| align=center| 1-0
| Ikuhisa Minowa
| Decision
| Lumax Cup: Tournament of J '96
| 
| align=center| 2
| align=center| 3:00
| Japan
|

See also
List of male mixed martial artists

References

External links
 
 Yuzo Tateishi at mixedmartialarts.com

Japanese male mixed martial artists
Living people
Year of birth missing (living people)